Peter Mahamudu Msolla (born 6 November 1945) is a Tanzanian CCM politician and Member of Parliament for Kilolo constituency since 2005.

References

1945 births
Living people
Chama Cha Mapinduzi MPs
Tanzanian MPs 2010–2015
Malangali Secondary School alumni
Mkwawa Secondary School alumni
University of Nairobi alumni
Alumni of the University of Glasgow
Academic staff of Sokoine University of Agriculture